This is a list of famous Valencian people (people from the Land of Valencia).

Religious Figures 

 Juan Andrés  (1740–1817), jesuit
 Cosme de Torrès (1510–1570), missionary
 Saint Louis Bertrand (1526–1581), saint
 Saint Francis Borgia (1510–1572), saint
 Saint Vincent Ferrer (1350–1419), saint
 Pope Alexander VI (1431–1503), pope
 Pope Callixtus III (1378–1458), pope
 Canut of Bon (1846–1896), Spanish preacher in Chile

Politicians 
 José Luis Ábalos (born 1959), politician
 Carmen Alborch (1947–2018), politician
 Rita Barberá Nolla (1948–2016), politician
 Joan Calabuig (born 1960), politician
 Agustí Cerdà i Argent (born 1965), politician
 Josep Guia (born 1947), politician
 Joan Lerma (born 1951), politician
 María Sornosa Martínez (born 1949), politician
 Ximo Puig (born 1959), politician

Artists 
 José Benlliure y Gil (1858–1937), painter
 Mariano Benlliure (1862–1947), sculptor
 Santiago Calatrava (born 1951), architect
 Vicente de Espona (1918–1995), painter and sculptor
 Victoria Francés (born 1982), illustrator
 Vicente Masip (1506–1579), painter
 Ignacio Pinazo Camarlench (1849–1916), painter
 Joaquín Sorolla y Bastida (1863–1923), painter
 Alonso Sánchez Coello (1531/2–1588), painter

Musicians 
 Ester Andujar (born 1976), singer
 Nino Bravo (1944–1973), singer
 José Herrando (1720/1721–1763), violinist and composer
 Jose Iturbi (1895–1980), pianist
 Amparo Iturbi (1898–1969), pianist
 María Teresa Oller (1920-2018), composer and folklorist
 Joaquín Rodrigo (1901–1999), composer
 Concha Piquer (1908–1990), singer
 Camilo Sesto (1946–2019), singer
 Francisco Tárrega (1852–1909), guitarist

Sports/Athletics 
 Roberto Bautista Agut (born 1988), tennis player
 José Cabanes (born 1981), pilotari
 Paco Cabanes Pastor (1954–2021), pilotari
 Alberto Arnal (1913–1966), pilotari
 Raúl Bravo (born 1981), football player
 Ángel Casero (born 1972), cyclist
 Miguel de las Cuevas (born 1986), football player
 Alex Debón (born 1976), motorcycle racer
 Héctor Faubel (born 1983), motorcycle racer
 David Ferrer (born 1982), tennis player
 Juan Carlos Ferrero (born 1980), tennis player
 Sergio Gadea (born 1984), motorcycle racer
 Alfred Hernando (born 1957), pilotari
 Vicente Grau Juan (born 1968), pilotari
 Vicente Iborra (born 1988), football player
 Jorge Martínez, Aspar, (born 1962), motorcycle racer
 Anabel Medina Garrigues (born 1982), tennis player
 José Jorge Mezquita García (born 1967), pilotari
 Juanma Ortiz (born 1982), football player
 Julio Palau Lozano (1925–2015), pilotari
 José Francisco Molina (born 1970), football player
 Jaume Morales Moltó (born 1973), pilotari
 Álvaro Navarro Serra (born 1973), pilotari
 Enric Sarasol (born 1964), pilotari
 José María Sarasol (born 1970), pilotari
 Arturo Tizón (born 1984), motorcycle racer
 Juan Francisco Torres (born 1985), football player
 Mateo Túnez (born 1989), motorcycle racer
 Ángel Rodríguez (born 1985), motorcycle racer
 Vicente Rodríguez (born 1981), football player
 Antonio Reig (born 1932), pilotari
 Francisco Rufete (born 1976), football player
 Nicolás Terol (born 1988), motorcycle racer

Literature 
 Vicente Blasco Ibáñez (1867–1928), writer
 Guillén de Castro y Bellvis (1569–1631), writer
 Isabel-Clara Simó (1943–2020), writer
 Toni Cucarella (born 1959), writer
 Joan Fuster (1922–1992), writer
 Gaspar Gil Polo (1530?–1591), writer
 Miguel Hernández (1910–1942), poet
 Maria Ibars i Ibars (1892–1965) writer and teacher
 Ausiàs March (1397?–1459), writer
 Juan Jose Marti (1570?–1640), writer
 José Martínez Ruiz, Azorín, (1873–1967), writer
 Joanot Martorell (1413–1468), writer
 Gabriel Miró (1879–1930), writer
 Vicent Partal (born 1960), journalist
 Joan Roís de Corella (1435–1497), writer
 Jordi de Sant Jordi (1390?–1424?), writer
 Maximiliano Thous Orts (1875–1947), writer
 Isabel de Villena (1430–1490), writer
 Cristóbal de Virués (1550–1614), writer

Acting/Performance/Film 
 Nacho Duato (born 1957), dancer
 Antonio Ferrandis (1921–2000), actor
 Antonio Gades (1936–2004), dancer
 Luis García Berlanga (1921–2010), film director

Academics 
 Al-Shatibi (died 1388), Islamic scholar
 Jaime Caruana (born 1952), economist
 Antonio José Cavanilles (1745–1804), botanist
 Ibn Jubayr (1145–1217), geographer
 Manuel Sanchis i Guarner (1911–1981), philologist
 Álvaro Pascual-Leone (born 1961), neurologist
 Enric Valor i Vives (1911–2000), philologist
 Ingar Roggen (born 1934), Norwegian sociologist
 Pedro Solbes (born 1942), economist

Other 
 Cayetano Ripoll (1778–1826), schoolmaster
 Vicente Rojo Lluch (1894–1966), army officer
 Joan Lluís Vives (1492–1540), humanist

See also 
 List of Spaniards

List
Valencians
Valencians